Don Davis (born 13 March 1969) is an Irish former Gaelic footballer who played as a full-forward for the Cork senior team.

Born in Skibbereen, County Cork, Davis first played competitive Gaelic football whilst at school at St Fachtna's De La Salle Secondary School. He arrived on the inter-county scene at the age of seventeen when he first linked up with the Cork minor team, before later lining out with the under-21 side. He made his senior debut in the 1993 championship. Davis went on to play a key role for the team over the next seven years, winning four Munster medals and one National Football League medal. He was an All-Ireland runner-up on two occasions.

Davis was a member of the Munster inter-provincial team on one occasion, however, he ended his career without a Railway Cup medal. At club level he is an All-Ireland medallist with O'Donovan Rossa, alongside his brother Tony and Pat, who suffered a horrible injury in the semi-final against Lavey. Don has also won one Munster and one championship medal.

His brother Tony was a two-time All-Ireland medallist with Cork, while his brother Pat has also captained Cork in a national league clash against Kildare.

Throughout his career Davis made 23 championship appearances for Cork. He retired from inter-county football following the conclusion of the 2000 championship.

Davis is widely regarded as one of Cork's greatest-ever Gaelic footballers. He has often been voted onto teams made up of the sport's greats, including at centre-forward on a special Cork team made up of players never to have won an All-Ireland medal.

In retirement from play Davis has become involved in coaching and team management. In 2013 he was named as a selector as part of Brian Cuthbert's management team for the Cork senior footballers.

Honours

Playing honours
O'Donovan Rossa
All-Ireland Senior Club Football Championship (1): 1993
Munster Senior Club Football Championship (1): 1992
Cork Senior Football Championship (1): 1992

Cork
Munster Senior Football Championship (4): 1993, 1994, 1995, 1999
National Football League (1): 1999
All-Ireland Under-21 Football Championship (1): 1989
Munster Under-21 Football Championship (1): 1989
Munster Minor Football Championship (1): 1987

References

1969 births
Living people
Cork inter-county Gaelic footballers
Garda Síochána officers
Munster inter-provincial Gaelic footballers
O'Donovan Rossa (Cork) Gaelic footballers